Rafael Osuna and Dennis Ralston were the defending champions, but Osuna did not compete. Ralston competed with Chuck McKinley but lost in the quarterfinals to Roy Emerson and Neale Fraser.

Emerson and Fraser defeated Bob Hewitt and Fred Stolle in the final, 6–4, 6–8, 6–4, 6–8, 8–6 to win the gentlemen's doubles tennis title at the 1961 Wimbledon Championship.

Seeds

  Roy Emerson /  Neale Fraser (champions)
  Rod Laver /  Bob Mark (semifinals)
  Nicola Pietrangeli /  Orlando Sirola (first round)
  Luis Ayala /  Ramanathan Krishnan (quarterfinals)

Draw

Finals

Top half

Section 1

Section 2

Bottom half

Section 3

Section 4

References

External links

Men's Doubles
Wimbledon Championship by year – Men's doubles